BattleTech Tactical Handbook is a game supplement published by FASA in 1994 for the mecha wargame BattleTech.

Description
BattleTech Tactical Handbook is an 80-page softcover book written by Jim Long and Stuart Johnson containing advanced rules and additional equipment for BattleTech. 

The first part of the book offers 
 a "double-blind" option for combat, where the two combatants maneuver their units on separate maps, and a neutral referee tells each player what is seen.
 a strategic operational campaign that links a series of scenarios together.

The second part of the book provides advanced rules for
 ballistic weapons
 four-legged mecha
 line of sight

Reception
In the November 1994 edition of Dragon (Issue #211), Rick Swan warned players that these rules added complexities to an already complex game, concluding, "All this is strictly for wargamers — make that serious wargamers. Role-players can put their wallets away."

References

BattleTech supplements